The Music Box is a Laurel and Hardy short film comedy released in 1932. It was directed by James Parrott, produced by Hal Roach and distributed by Metro-Goldwyn-Mayer. The film, which depicts the pair attempting to move a piano up a long flight of steps, won the first Academy Award for Best Live Action Short (Comedy) in 1932. In 1997, it was selected for preservation in the National Film Registry by the Library of Congress as being "culturally, historically, or aesthetically significant".

Plot
In a music store, a woman (Hazel Howell) orders a player piano as a surprise birthday gift for her husband. She tells the manager her address — 1127 Walnut Avenue — and he hires the Laurel and Hardy Transfer Company to deliver the piano in their freight wagon.

The duo soon learn from a postman (Charlie Hall) that the home is at the top of a very long stairway. Their attempts to carry the piano up the stairs result in it rolling and crashing into the street below several times, twice with Ollie in tow. During their first attempt, they encounter a nursemaid (Lilyan Irene) pushing a baby carriage down the steps; in trying to let her pass, they knock the piano back down the stairs. After the lady laughs at them, Stan kicks her in her backside, causing her to punch him back and hit Ollie over the head with a milk bottle. Stan and Ollie then heft the piano back up the stairs. In a double entendre line, the angry woman tells a policeman (Sam Lufkin) on the corner that she was "kicked right in the middle of my daily duties". The cop then confronts the hapless duo, kicking Ollie twice and hitting Stan with his nightstick after the latter suggests the officer is "bounding over his steps" (i.e. "overstepping his bounds"). Meanwhile, the piano has rolled down the steps again.

The two doggedly persist in carrying the piano up the stairs for a third time. Halfway up, they encounter the short-tempered and pompous Professor Theodore von Schwartzenhoffen (Billy Gilbert), M.D., A.D., D.D.S., F.L.D., F-F-F-und-F. He impatiently tells them to take the piano out of his way; he should like to pass. Ollie very reasonably and sensibly suggests he walk around, which sets off the Professor in a fit of Teutonic rage. He screams at Stan and Ollie to get the piano out of his way, and Stan knocks the Professor's top hat down the stairs and into the street, where it is crushed by a passing vehicle. The outraged professor leaves, loudly threatening to have the two arrested.

Finally, Stan and Ollie get the piano to the top, where Ollie falls into a fountain. As they ring the bell of 1127 Walnut Avenue, the piano rolls back down to the street again. They wearily drag it back up the stairs, and meet the postman by the house, who informs them they did not have to lift the piano up the stairs; they could have driven up the hill and stopped in front of the house. Stan and Ollie promptly carry the piano back down the stairs, put it back in their wagon and drive it up the hill to the house.

Finding no one home, they finally succeed in getting the piano in the house, after dropping it into the fountain and falling in themselves. They make a shambles of the living room while unpacking it. Meanwhile, the owner of 1127 Walnut Avenue is revealed to be Professor von Schwartzenhoffen, who returns and is outraged at what he finds, as he hates pianos. He attacks the piano with an axe, destroying it, but regrets his actions when his wife returns home and tearfully tells her husband it had been a surprise birthday present. To apologize for his actions, the Professor signs the delivery receipt, but the pen Stan and Ollie give him squirts ink over his face. Furious, Schwartzenhoffen blows his temper again and makes the duo run away.

Cast

 Stan Laurel as Stan
 Oliver Hardy as Ollie
Uncredited cast
 Billy Gilbert as Professor Theodore von Schwartzenhoffen, M.D., A.D., D.D.S., F.L.D., F.F.F.und F.
 Hazel Howell as Mrs. von Schwartzenhoffen
 Sam Lufkin as police officer
 Lilyan Irene as nursemaid
 Charlie Hall as postman
 William Gillespie as piano salesman

Location
The steps, 133 with multiple landings, which are the focal point of The Music Box, still exist in the Silver Lake district of Los Angeles, near the Laurel and Hardy Park. The steps are a public staircase that connects Vendome Street (at the base of the hill) with Descanso Drive (at the top of the hill), and are located at 923-925 North Vendome Street near the intersection of Del Monte Drive. A plaque commemorating the film was set into one of the lower steps.

The steps can also be seen in the Charley Chase silent comedy Isn't Life Terrible? (1925), during a scene in which Chase is trying to sell fountain pens to Fay Wray. The steps are also used, for a gag similar to Hats Off and The Music Box, in Ice Cold Cocos (1926), a Billy Bevan comedy short directed by Del Lord. The steps are also referenced in The Laurel and Hardy Love Affair, a short story by Ray Bradbury, as the meeting place of the couple in the story, who call each other Ollie and Stan in homage to the comedic duo.

Although similar in appearance, the staircase is not the same one used by The Three Stooges in their 1941 film An Ache in Every Stake. Those stairs (147 steps in length) are approximately two miles northeast, located at 2212 Edendale Place in the Silver Lake district of Los Angeles.

Reception 
The short was popular with audiences in 1932 and generally well received by critics. After previewing The Music Box in late February that year, the New York trade paper The Film Daily assured theater owners that the comedy "is up to the Laurel-Hardy standard, and should score easily." Motion Picture Herald, after previewing the film in March, described it as "great fun" and noted, "Unusually long for a comedy [short], it is well worth the extra length." The Chicago-based movie magazine Motion Picture is even more enthusiastic about the comedy in its June 1932 issue:
Not all contemporary reviews, however, were positive. Variety, the entertainment industry's leading paper in 1932, did not publish its review of The Music Box until November 22, over seven months after MGM officially released the short to theaters. The reviewer, Alfred Greason, wrote:

Remakes

The film is a partial remake of their lost silent short Hats Off! (1927), directed by Hal Yates, which utilized a washing machine instead of a piano, and was filmed at the same location and is today considered a lost film. Hats Off was itself remade by Edgar Kennedy in 1945 as It's Your Move (again directed by Yates), but utilizing a different staircase although located in the same vicinity where the "Music Box Steps" are in Silver Lake (known as the Descanso Stairs, they are situated at the intersection of Descanso and Larissa drives, specifically between the residences of 3217 Descanso Drive and 3200-3206 Larissa Drive, and one block from Sunset Boulevard, which can be seen in the background in several long shots).
Hal Roach Studios colorized The Music Box in 1986 with a remastered stereo soundtrack featuring the Hal Roach Studios incidental stock music score conducted by Ronnie Hazelhurst. The film was later released on VHS along with a colorized version of Helpmates. 
The Music Box was also dubbed in Spanish, with the lengthy title No cualquiera aguanta un piano, mucho menos una pianola (the English translation being "Not anyone can load a piano, less a pianola").
With some aspects of the original script omitted, actor Jorge Arvizu and other actors have produced additional Spanish versions of The Music Box, as well as other remakes of Laurel and Hardy shorts and features.

References

External links

The Music Box essay  by Randy Skretvedt on the National Film Registry website 

 
 
 
 Music Box Steps in OpenStreetMap
 The Music Box essay by Daniel Eagan in America's Film Legacy: The Authoritative Guide to the Landmark Movies in the National Film Registry, A&C Black, 2010 , pages 195-196 

1932 films
1932 comedy films
American black-and-white films
Films directed by James Parrott
Laurel and Hardy (film series)
Live Action Short Film Academy Award winners
Metro-Goldwyn-Mayer short films
United States National Film Registry films
Films with screenplays by H. M. Walker
1930s English-language films
1930s American films